The 1929 French Championships (now known as the French Open) was a tennis tournament that took place on the outdoor clay courts at the Stade Roland-Garros in Paris, France. The tournament ran from 20 May until 3 June. It was the 34th staging of the French Championships and the second Grand Slam tournament of the year.

René Lacoste and Helen Wills Moody won the singles titles. It was Lacoste's seventh and last Grand Slam singles title.

Finals

Men's singles

 René Lacoste (FRA) defeated  Jean Borotra (FRA) 6–3, 2–6, 6–0, 2–6, 8–6

Women's singles

 Helen Wills Moody (USA) defeated  Simonne Mathieu (FRA) 6–3, 6–4

Men's doubles

 René Lacoste (FRA) /  Jean Borotra (FRA) defeated  Henri Cochet (FRA) /  Jacques Brugnon (FRA) 6–3, 3–6, 6–3, 3–6, 8–6

Women's doubles
 Lilí Álvarez (ESP) /  Kea Bouman (NED) defeated  Bobbie Heine (RSA) /  Alida Neave (RSA) 7–5, 6–3

Mixed doubles
 Eileen Bennett Whittingstall (GBR) /  Henri Cochet (FRA) defeated  Helen Wills Moody (USA) /  Frank Hunter (USA) 6–3, 6–2

References

External links
 French Open official website

French Championships
French Championships (tennis) by year
May 1929 sports events
June 1929 sports events
1929 in Paris
French